Mordellistena engelharti is a beetle in the genus Mordellistena of the family Mordellidae. It was described in 1910 by Friedrich Julius Schilsky.

References

engelharti
Beetles described in 1910